Kristýna Nepivodová is a Czech tennis player.

Nepivodová made her WTA main draw debut at the 2018 Citi Open in the doubles draw partnering Nicole Hammond.

Nepivodová played college tennis at the University of the District of Columbia.

References

Living people
Czech female tennis players
UDC Firebirds athletes
College women's tennis players in the United States
1989 births